John P. Slattery (born April 5, 1958) is an American former politician who represented the 12th Essex district in the Massachusetts House of Representatives from 1995 to 2003 and was a Peabody, Massachusetts City Counclior from 1993 to 1994.

While originally a staunch supporter of the death penalty, Slattery later came to oppose it, with his vote against a 1997 bill to reinstate the practice in Massachusetts causing the resolution to fail.

Slattery ran for lieutenant governor of Massachusetts in 2002, but lost the Democratic nomination to Chris Gabrieli. He was a candidate for mayor of Peabody in 2005, but lost to incumbent Michael Bonfanti. In 2012, John announced his plans to run for Massachusetts State Senate. He lost the Democratic primary to Joan Lovely, then a member of the Salem city council.

References

1958 births
20th-century American politicians
21st-century American politicians
Candidates in the 2002 United States elections
Candidates in the 2012 United States elections
Living people
Democratic Party members of the Massachusetts House of Representatives
People from Peabody, Massachusetts
People from Saugus, Massachusetts
Suffolk University Law School alumni
Suffolk University alumni